Several United States presidents have made presidential visits to Australia and New Zealand. The first visit by an incumbent to these Australasian nations was made in 1966 by Lyndon B. Johnson. His three-day five-city visit to Australia was intended as a show of gratitude to the Australian nation for its then emphatic support for the Vietnam War. Four presidents have traveled there since. Prior to arriving in Australia, Johnson visited New Zealand. He went primarily to shore up support for the war in Vietnam. Only one sitting president has visited since.

Australia

New Zealand

See also
 Australia–United States relations
 New Zealand–United States relations
 Foreign relations of Australia
 Foreign relations of New Zealand
 Foreign policy of the United States
 Foreign relations of the United States

References

Australia–United States relations
New Zealand–United States relations
Lists of United States presidential visits